The 7th Annual Streamy Awards was the seventh installment of the Streamy Awards honoring the best in American streaming television series and their creators. The awards were broadcast live from Twitter on September 26, 2017 from The Beverly Hilton in Beverly Hills, California. They were hosted by YouTube star Jon Cozart. Awards for Best Comedy Series and Best Drama Series were introduced for the 2017 Streamys to put a greater emphasis on original series, and the performance awards were not split by gender as they had been in previous years in an effort to make the awards more inclusive. The 2017 Streamys also featured a shift towards independent content creators.

The 1st annual Purpose Awards @ the Streamys were announced on August 16 and presented at a separate event hosted by Burnie Burns and Ashley Jenkins at the Conga Room in L.A. Live on September 25.

Performers 
The 7th Annual Streamy Awards featured the first live performance in over 30 years from American disco group Village People. They ended the show with a medley of their most popular songs.

Winners and nominees

The nominees were announced via Twitter on August 22, 2017. 24 of the awards were announced on September 24 at the Streamy Premiere Awards in Santa Monica, hosted by Lloyd Ahlquist. The remaining 17 awards were announced during the main ceremony at The Beverly Hilton on September 26. As part of a deal between Dick Clark Productions and Twitter, the awards were livestreamed on Twitter. Winners of the categories were selected by the Streamys Blue Ribbon Panel except for the Audience Choice awards which were put to a public vote.

Winners are listed first, in bold.

Purpose Awards 

The first annual Purpose Awards were presented at a separate event hosted by Burnie Burns and Ashley Jenkins at the Conga Room in L.A. Live on September 25, 2017. Each Purpose Award category has three honorees with one of the honorees also receiving the "Inspiration Award" for that category. Honorees are listed in bold and the Inspiration Award winner is indicated with a ‡.

Reception 
Mikey Glazer of TheWrap described the show as "rowdy, political and Jake Paul-hating" and described Jon Cozart's opening speech as "searing". Talking to The Hollywood Reporter, Cozart described his job as host as "to dig into the Streamys and reveal the hypocrisy of the new media industry. I'm exposing us for what we are, which is a room full of narcissists with good intentions." According to The Hollywood Reporter, two main themes of the night were politics and diversity. Director of Brown Girls Sam Bailey praised the show for focusing on creators saying "It really shows there is work done at home by individual people without a network behind them."

See also
List of Streamy Award winners

References

External links
Streamy Awards website

 Streamy Awards
Streamy Awards
Streamy Awards
2017 in Internet culture